The World Poker Tour (WPT) is an internationally televised gaming and entertainment brand. Since 2002, the World Poker Tour has operated a series of international poker tournaments and associated television series broadcasting playdown and the final table of each tournament.

The most prominent of World Poker Tour events belong to the WPT Main Tour. The WPT Main Tour focuses on the buy-in range of $3,500-$25,000, and winners of official WPT Main Tour events are awarded a membership to the WPT Champions Club. The WPT Champions Cup is the trophy awarded to all winners of WPT Main Tour events, and champions have their names engraved on the Cup.

Business
The World Poker Tour was started in 2002 in the United States by attorney/television producer Steven Lipscomb, who served as CEO of WPT Enterprises, Inc. (WPTE).

In November 2009, PartyGaming announced its acquisition of the World Poker Tour for $12.3 million. In 2011, PartyGaming merged with bwin to form bwin.Party Digital Entertainment.

In December 2014, World Poker Tour announced an alliance with Ourgame, agreeing to license products and services on an exclusive basis in more than a dozen countries across Asia. In addition, Ourgame received the rights to use the WPT logo and trademark exclusively in Bhutan, Cambodia, China, Hong Kong, Indonesia, Laos, Korea, Nepal, Macau, Malaysia, Taiwan, Thailand, Philippines, and Vietnam and operate on pokermonster.com.

In June 2015, The World Poker Tour (WPT) announced that bwin.party sold the company to Ourgame International Holdings Ltd. for a price of $35 million in cash.

In 2021 the World Poker Tour was sold to Element Partners for $105 million.

Television
The year-round WPT television show has broadcast globally in more than 150 countries and territories, and is currently producing its 18th season, which airs on Fox Sports Regional Networks in the United States. In August 2016, the World Poker Tour and Fox Sports announced a five-year deal to see Fox Sports broadcast the WPT through Season 19.

The WPT television show currently features commentary and analysis by Tony Dunst and Vince Van Patten. Dunst joined the World Poker Tour as host of the WPT Raw Deal during Season 9 after winning the role through an open casting competition. Following the retirement of Mike Sexton from the WPT commentary booth after 15 years, Dunst was elevated into the role alongside Van Patten.

Joining Dunst and Van Patten for all WPT televised broadcasts is anchor Lynn Gilmartin. Gilmartin's role focuses on hosting and presenting the show, as well as offering intimate interviews and sideline reporting. Gilmartin assumed the anchor role for Season 12 and remains the current anchor.

Prior to Gilmartin, Shana Hiatt served as the show host and sideline reporter in its first three seasons. Courtney Friel took over the host role for the fourth season, and Sabina Gadecki for the fifth. Layla Kayleigh and Kimberly Lansing began serving as hostesses in Season VI. Poker player and reporter Amanda Leatherman was the host for Season VII while Lansing was on maternity leave. Lansing returned as the anchor for Season 9 through 11.

The first season aired on the Travel Channel on American cable television in the spring of 2003. The show made its network debut on February 1, 2004, on NBC with a special "Battle of Champions" tournament, which aired against CBS coverage of the Super Bowl XXXVIII pre-game show. The Travel Channel aired the first five seasons of the Tour. In April 2007, WPTE announced that the series would move to GSN for its sixth season in the spring of 2008. 'The first WPT tournament to air on GSN, the Mirage Poker Showdown, debuted on March 24, 2008. In July 2008, WPTE announced that the series would move to Fox Sports Regional Networks for its seventh season.

Following the November 2009 acquisition of the World Poker Tour by PartyGaming plc, the new owners added a second series of televised WPT events under their PartyPoker brand name. This series has, to date, focused on televising the European stops of the WPT. Mike Sexton continues to provide commentary, though he is partnered with Denmark-based American commentator Jesse May rather than Vince Van Patten. The role of female show host and sideline reporter has been served by a number of personalities, often from the country where the event is held. One exception is Canadian born poker player Kara Scott, who has served as host for a number of the PartyPoker branded telecasts of these European WPT events.

The show's hosts, Tony Dunst and Vince Van Patten, sit at a booth near the final table, providing commentary and occasionally interacting with the players during the game. However, their specific comments about hole cards are recorded after the tournament takes place because gaming regulations prohibit them from observing a live feed of the "hole card cameras" while on the set. These cameras, built into the table, allow viewers to see the face-down hole cards dealt to each player.

In 2014, the World Poker Tour launched a high roller tournament series, WPT Alpha8, broadcasting on Fox Sports 1. The series originally featured commentary and analysis by Ali Nejad and Olivier Busquet, with Gilmartin serving as anchor. In later seasons, Vince Van Patten and Tony Dunst replaced Nejad and Busquet, while Lynn Gilmartin continued to serve as anchor.

The first three seasons of WPT are available on NTSC DVD.

In February 2019, WPT announced a deal with BT Sport to broadcast season XV of WPT. The deal expands WPT coverage to the UK and Ireland. During season XV, former WPT television commentator Mike Sexton won his first WPT event.

In March 2019, WPT announced a deal with TV Azteca to bring WPT assets to Latin America.

Professional Poker Tour
A series of spin-off tournaments, titled the Professional Poker Tour, began filming in 2004.  Broadcast of the series was delayed, which was partly due to a dispute with the Travel Channel over rights.  In the fall of 2005, WPTE announced that "a cable channel" (believed to be ESPN) had withdrawn from bidding for the PPT series, and that WPTE was negotiating with the Travel Channel to air the series.  On January 30, 2006, WPTE and the Travel Channel announced that they had dismissed all open lawsuits. The series began regular broadcast July 5, 2006, but was suspended after one season as WPTE couldn't find a television home for a second season.

ClubWPT 
In 2008, the WPT launched a new product called ClubWPT. It is a subscription-based club where members can pay a monthly fee to play in tournaments that award over $100,000 in cash and prizes each month.

PlayWPT
In 2016, WPT launched a new social casino platform called PlayWPT, offering poker and slots.

With PlayWPT Poker, players can participate in ring games, tournaments, and sit-n-gos, and players can represent themselves at the table with avatars animated emojis. PlayWPT is available on desktop and mobile.

Sherman Act lawsuit
In July 2006, seven poker professionals sued WPTE, alleging violations of the Sherman Antitrust Act, the California Cartwright Act, and intentional interference with contract.  The professionals (Chris Ferguson, Andy Bloch, Annie Duke, Joe Hachem, Phil Gordon, Howard Lederer, and Greg Raymer) alleged that WPTE's standard release forms, required for participation in WPTE events, were anti-competitive and designed to interfere with their contractual obligations to other companies. The anti-competition claim was based on the fact that WPTE's contracts with the casinos that host its tournaments barred those casinos (and other casinos owned by the same parent companies) from hosting non-WPTE poker events.  The claim of interference with contract was based on the releases' claim to perpetual rights to the players' likenesses for any use WPTE wished.  The players claimed that this would put them in violation of other contracts (such as Ferguson's Activision Games contract or several players' contracts with online poker sites).

Hachem and Raymer dropped out of the lawsuit before its eventual settlement.

In April 2008, WPT Enterprises, Inc. settled with the five players remaining in the lawsuit. Chris Ferguson said about the settlement, "We are happy to have come to an agreement that is fair to all players, and to have put in place a new release that clears up ambiguities in how players' images may be used. We are especially happy that this new release will apply to all poker players who wish to participate in WPT tournaments and events."

WPT Player of the Year
While the winner of the season-ending WPT World Championship (simply the WPT Championship before season 9) is deemed that season's WPT Champion, the WPT also determines a Player of the Year to recognize the player who achieves consistent high finishes in WPT events throughout the entire season.

The Player of the Year is determined by a points system, with the player who earns the most points each season being named the WPT Player of the Year.  The season-ending WPT World Championship is a points-earning event for the Player of the Year calculation.

Through the end of Season 9, no player has been named WPT Player of the Year and also captured the WPT Championship.  The closest to date is Season 7 WPT Player of the Year Bertrand Grospellier, who finished 3rd in that season's WPT Championship.

In the first eight seasons of the World Poker Tour, only four players have finished in the money at least once. These players are Phil Hellmuth, Erik Seidel, Mark Seif, and Surinder Sunar.

Points system
During the first 8 seasons, only the 6 players at the final table in each Open event, plus the last (7th) player eliminated before the final table, earned points as follows:

 Winner: 1,000 points
 Runner-up: 700 points
 3rd place: 600 points
 4th place: 500 points
 5th place: 400 points
 6th place: 300 points
 7th place: 200 points (television final table bubble)

Starting with season 9, the points system was adjusted to recognize the number of entries and the size of the prize pool for each event:

 Generally, 10% of the participants in each event will finish in the money (ITM), so the system now gives Player of the Year points to all ITM players.
 The maximum number of points awarded to the event winner are now scaled to the size of the prize pool, with 600 points to the winner of an event with a prize pool smaller than $500,000 and 1400 points to the winner of an event with a prize pool larger than $4,000,000.  The season-ending WPT World Championship, no matter the prize pool, also starts at 1400 points to the winner.
 The system still operates on a descending scale, though the scale provides a minimum of 50 points to all the 'bottom' ITM players in any event.

WPT Main Event winners

Records
Information correct as of ...?

Record winnings
The largest win in a WPT event is the $3,970,415 paid to Carlos Mortensen for winning the season-ending WPT Championship for season 5.

Progression of largest winnings
The progression of the "highest payout" through the history of the WPT, starting with the win by Gus Hansen in Event 1 of WPT Season 1.  Entries have declined since the poker boom ended, with no increase in "highest payout" for a number of years – the highest has not increased since an event in 2007.

WPT World Championship ($25,000 buy-in)
Each WPT season culminates with the $25,000 buy-in WPT World Championship (simply the WPT Championship before season 9). As with regular events, the prize pool has declined since the poker boom ended: participants dropped from a peak of 639 in 2007, to 146 in 2013. The WPT organizers reacted by dropping the buy-in to $15,000 from 2014 onwards, limiting participation to winners of WPT events since the start of the series, and changing the name again, to WPT Tournament of Champions. There has been no increase in "highest payout" since the $3,970,415 at the 2005 World Championship, and the top prize has consistently been under $500,000 since the 2016 World Championship.

WPT Ladies
In January 2008, the WPT announced a set of tournaments for women, known as WPT Ladies.  The first season had five events, with buy-ins ranging from $300 to $1,500.  Nancy Todd finished first in the Ladies Championship with Vanessa Selbst finishing second. There are currently no WPT Ladies events scheduled.

WPT Walk of Fame

The World Poker Tour Walk of Fame was designed to honor those poker players who have played the game well at the highest levels as well as those who have promoted the spread of it through film, television, and literature.

The first inductees were poker legends Doyle Brunson and Gus Hansen, as well as actor James Garner.

In February 2004, the World Poker Tour Walk of Fame inducted its second members at the Commerce Casino in a ceremony before top pros and celebrities in town for the World Poker Tour Invitational Poker Tournament. The induction ceremony was staged on the doorstep of Commerce Casino.

No new players have been inducted since 2004.

WPT Honors Award
The WPT Honors Award launched in early 2017, with Ms. Linda Johnson named as the first recipient. Later that year, 15-year WPT commentator Mike Sexton and gaming industry icon Bruno Fitoussi became the second and third honorees. In 2018, Steve Lipscomb and Lyle Berman each received the fourth and fifth honors.

The WPT Honors Award is the WPT's highest honor, awarded to members of the poker industry in celebration and appreciation of exceptional contributions made to the World Poker Tour and the poker community as a whole. Presented as determined by WPT CEO Adam Pliska and the World Poker Tour, the WPT Honors Award is given in recognition to those who distinguish themselves by excellence and dedication beyond expectations.

WPT Honors Award Recipients
 2017: Bruno Fitoussi, Linda Johnson, Mike Sexton
 2018: Lyle Berman, Steve Lipscomb
 2019: Deb Giardina, Matt Savage
 2022: Isai Scheinberg, Vincent Van Patten

Deal
A fictional WPT championship match is the setting for the 2007 feature film Deal. Sexton, Van Patten, and Friel play themselves and a number of other poker professionals and poker-playing celebrities are reportedly in the cast. The WPT set was shipped to New Orleans for filming following the season 4 championship.

References

External links
 Official site

 
Travel Channel original programming
Poker tournaments
Poker companies
Television shows about poker
2002 establishments in Nevada
Television shows set in Nevada
Television shows shot in the Las Vegas Valley
Fox Sports original programming
Fox Sports Networks original programming